Darren Reginald Hall (born May 2, 2000) is an American football cornerback for the Atlanta Falcons of the National Football League (NFL). He played college football at San Diego State.

College career
Hall attended and played college football at San Diego State from 2017 to 2020.

Professional career

Atlanta Falcons
Hall was drafted by the Atlanta Falcons in the fourth round, 108th overall, of the 2021 NFL Draft. He signed his four-year rookie contract with Atlanta on June 17, 2021. He made his NFL debut in Week 3 of the 2021 season against the New York Giants. He made his first start in Week 17 against the Buffalo Bills. He appeared in 14 games as a rookie. He finished with one sack, 27 total tackles, and three passes defensed.

Hall appeared in all 17 games and started nine. He finished with 45 total tackles, three passes defensed, one forced fumble, and one fumble recovery.

References

External links
 Atlanta Falcons bio
 SDSU Aztecs bio

2000 births
Living people
American football cornerbacks
San Diego State Aztecs football players
Players of American football from Pasadena, California
People from Baldwin Park, California
Atlanta Falcons players